Chapel Hill High School is a public high school in Chapel Hill, North Carolina. It is located close to the University of North Carolina at Chapel Hill. Chapel Hill High School is part of the Chapel Hill-Carrboro City Schools district which contains two other high schools, Carrboro High School and East Chapel Hill High School.

History
Chapel Hill High School's original school building was located on West Franklin Street, and housed the school for white students starting in 1916. That same year, Orange County Training School (which later became Lincoln High School), opened at 750 Merritt Mill Road for black students. In 1936, a new high school building for Chapel Hill High was constructed on Columbia Street, where the UNC Eshelman School of Pharmacy is now located. This school building burnt down in 1942, and wasn't rebuilt until after World War II. Classes would meet at various locations until a newly constructed school building opened back on West Franklin Street in 1947.

Chapel Hill High would remain at its West Franklin Street location until 1966. In 1966, a new high school building opened on High School Road, with Chapel Hill High merging with Lincoln High to form the new integrated Chapel Hill High School. Lincoln High School was known for its award-winning football and band programs. In particular, its 1961 football team won the NCHSAC state championship without a single point being scored against it all year, while averaging over 40 points per game.

On April 15, 2010, a student brought a gun on a school bus and accidentally shot it at the ground. No one was hurt, but the school and several nearby schools went on lockdown. The student was later arrested.

In June of 2018, construction began for a major ($70 million) renovation of Chapel Hill High, including the construction of new buildings. Construction was completed in August 2021.

Academics
In 1999, Chapel Hill High School was listed as one of the top-performing U.S. high schools in The Wall Street Journal (October 15, 1999), for "the best student performance over the past 10 years based on SAT, achievement-test and standardized-test scores."

In 2005, 62.5% of students took the SAT and scored an average of 1156 compared to a state average of 1008. Similarly, 97.3% of the student body has taken the PSAT, and scored an average of 155 compared to the state average of 133. Also, 69.2% (306 students) have participated in Advanced Placement (AP) examinations with 73.5% of all scores scoring above a 3. As of 2005, Chapel Hill High School also has a high graduation rate of 94.7%. In 2005, 94.7% of students were proficient on State English I tests, and 93.1% of students were proficient on State Algebra I tests.  The school posted the third highest average SAT score in the Raleigh Durham area: 1754 with 87.9% of students taking the test.

Athletics
Chapel Hill High School has around 20 athletic teams. In the fall, the school offers cheerleading, cross country, field hockey, football, men's soccer, women's tennis, ultimate frisbee, volleyball, and women's golf. In the winter, the school offers cheerleading, men's basketball, women's basketball, swimming and diving, and wrestling. In the spring, the school offers men's golf, men's lacrosse, women's soccer, softball, men's tennis, track, baseball, and women's lacrosse.

Chapel Hill High School has won many state championships in athletics such as back to back trophies in the 3A Men’s Soccer in 2017 and 2018, and their 3A Women’s Soccer program winning in 2018, tying the state record for number of goals allowed with 2.

The arts
Chapel Hill High has performing and visual arts programs.  The school has a marching band, jazz band, symphonic band, concert band, orchestra, percussion ensemble, drama program, and several choruses.

Schedule change
Before the 2006–07 school year, the high school used a six-period schedule. However, during the 2006–07 school year, a new controversial seven-period schedule was introduced. A mostly student-led protest organized sit downs with several members of the school board in order to avoid the change into a block schedule. After long talks between the two parties, the school board altered their plan to the now seven-period day.

2007–2008 cheating ring
During the 2007–2008 school year, a cheating ring was discovered inside the school. Several students had been in possession of a master key which they had used to repeatedly enter the school and teachers' rooms in order to access and photocopy tests and answer keys. The resulting answers were then used by these students to score higher on exams. The answer keys were usually stored on cell phones and passed or sent around between members of the group. Some colleges then contacted the school seeking information about who was involved such that the perpetrators could have their admissions revoked. However, only local colleges got in touch with the school, so most of the 11 implicated students managed to avoid harsh punishment.

The master key copies had been in existence for about two years before anyone was caught. To avoid the possibility of some of the copies not being confiscated, all of the school's doors were re-keyed and the new keys are being held under closer supervision. The cost of this re-keying has been estimated at several thousand dollars.

Notable alumni
Bill Ransom Campbell, member of a group of modernist architects in North Carolina that had a major academic and architectural influence on the Modernism movement
Anna Clendening, singer, actor, and Internet personality 
Harold Covington, white nationalist author, attended Chapel Hill High School from 1968-1971
Jamie Dell, professional soccer player
Sarah Dessen, author of many best-selling books for young adults
Dovonte Edwards, former NFL cornerback
Clark Gregg, actor who is seen in the CBS sitcom The New Adventures of Old Christine, and in the ABC series Agents of S.H.I.E.L.D. Married to Jennifer Grey.
Meredith Hagner, actress
Bernardo Harris, former NFL linebacker and Super Bowl XXXI champion with the Green Bay Packers
Alexander Julian, American clothing designer
Gina Kim, professional golfer with the LPGA
Estelle Lawson, women's amateur golfer
Mick Mixon, play-by-play radio voice announcer for the Carolina Panthers of the National Football League
Brian Roberts, 2x All-Star MLB player with the Baltimore Orioles
Henrik Rödl, professional basketball player
Clifford Skakle, former professional tennis player
Scott Speiser, actor and writer
Josh Stein, former NC state senator and current Attorney General of North Carolina
Matt Stevens, former NFL safety and Super Bowl XXXVI champion with the New England Patriots
Strick, Rapper
Ben Strong, American basketball coach
David Taylor, former NFL offensive tackle
James Taylor, singer/songwriter and guitarist (attended until mid junior year)
Livingston Taylor,  American singer-songwriter and folk musician; younger brother of James Taylor

References

External links
 The Chapel Hill High School official website
 Proconian newspaper website

Chapel Hill-Carrboro City Schools
Public high schools in North Carolina
Schools in Orange County, North Carolina